Daniel Frescó (born 1960) is an Argentinian journalist and author. He has practiced journalism since the age of 18. He started as a collaborator in the Clarín newspaper and in Radio Continental. In 1983 he was the first reporter for the  “Mitre informa primero” newscast. He was intensively activity in television, first as a reporter in the news editions of Canal 11- Telefé, covering both local and international events, and later as Executive Producer at Red de Noticias – the 24 hours information channel of Telefé, in CVN (Cablevisión Noticias) and in the Canal 7 newscasts. 

Since 2002, Frescó has dedicated himself to writing books on journalistic subjects such as the wave of abductions in Buenos Aires in the late 1990s.

Books
 Secuestros S.A.  (2003)  320pp.  Ediciones B. 
 Manu, el Cielo con las Manos (2005) Aguilar 304pp.  - Manu Ginóbili biography
 Enfermo de Futbol (2015) 349pp. Groupo Editorio Planeta S.A.I.C.

References

External links
 The Sky with My Hands

Argentine journalists
Male journalists
Argentine male writers
1960 births
Living people
Place of birth missing (living people)